Brookhampton is a small town in the Shire of Donnybrook-Balingup in the South West region of Western Australia.

It was first established as a railway station on the Donnybrook to Bridgetown railway line, which was completed in 1898. A primary school operated in the town from 1899 until 1940.  The local hall was an important community event location in the 1920s. 
A woodchip mill was proposed for the locality in the early 2000s.

References 

Towns in Western Australia
South West (Western Australia)